Amar Dukan is an Assamese term meaning 'Our Shop' to denote a notified Fair Price Shop in Assam which, besides providing the regular subsidized items under the Public Distribution System in India to the ration card holders, also sells some other essential commodities at reasonable rates fixed by the state Food, Civil Supplies & Consumer Affairs Department to general consumers under an initiative of the state government to strengthen the Public Distribution System (PDS). These specially converted Fair Price Shops started to function in many districts of the state in early 2011.

This initiative on the part of the state government was also an attempt to tame the spiraling prices of essential commodities and make them available to the common people at a significantly lower price compared to that in the open market. Onions, potatoes, mustard oil, refined oil, soya oil, dal, atta, suji, maida, soap, milk, toothpaste, toothbrushes and hair oil are some of the about 21 notified items which are kept by the Fair Price Shop-keeper in the Amar Dukan.

Not all the FPS in Assam are notified for functioning as Amar Dukan, nor does every Amar Dukan sell all the notified items.

Economy of Assam
Retailing in India